Peter Gardner (born Pete Zahradnick in Scarsdale, New York) is an American actor, best known for playing Darryl Whitefeather in The CW comedy-drama series Crazy Ex-Girlfriend.

Early life
Gardner studied improv at the Second City improv group in Chicago. Gardner mentored and directed both Tina Fey and Amy Poehler in multiple productions during their tenure at  Second City.

Career
In 2015, Gardner joined the cast of Crazy Ex-Girlfriend as a series regular and the owner of law firm Whitefeather.

Gardner also played the titular character in the short film Barry, released in 2016. He also played Carl, a stockbroker and fellow employee of Ryan, played by Charlie Sheen in the 2001 movie Good Advice, also starring Angie Harmon and Denise Richards. He played Alan's football coach on Son of Zorn. He played Father Michaels in the 2018 comedy web television series Liza on Demand. He also played a Dr. Terry Bournachle in the 2009 movie Labor Pains starring Lindsay Lohan.

Filmography

Film

Television

References

External links

 

Living people
Year of birth missing (living people)
Male actors from New York (state)
People from Scarsdale, New York